Mervyn Herbert Nevil Story Maskelyne (3 September 1823 – 20 May 1911) was an English geologist and politician.

Scientific career
Educated at Wadham College, Oxford, Maskelyne taught mineralogy and chemistry at Oxford from 1851, before becoming a professor of mineralogy, 1856–95. He was Keeper of Minerals at the British Museum from 1857 to 1880. He was made an honorary Fellow of Wadham in 1873.

Maskelyne was also a pioneer of photography and an associate of Fox Talbot.

The meteoritic mineral maskelynite was named after him.

Family

Mervyn was the eldest son of Antony Mervin Reeve Story and Margaret Maskelyne, the daughter of the Astronomer Royal, Nevil Maskelyne. The family adopted the name of Maskelyne on Nevil's coming of age as they had inherited that family's estate at Basset Down in Wiltshire.

Mervyn married Thereza Mary Dillwyn-Llewelyn (1834 – 21 February 1926) - Welsh astronomer and pioneer in scientific photography - on 29 June 1858.

Their daughter Mary married writer and politician Hugh Oakeley Arnold-Forster on 29 July 1885, and Hugh and Mary's granddaughter Vanda Morton published Nevil's biography in 1987 (see references). Their daughter Thereza was an advocate for domestic science who married physicist Arthur William Rucker in 1892.

Political career

He was Member of Parliament (MP) for Cricklade as a Liberal, 1880–1886, and as Liberal Unionist, 1886–1892, and a member of Wiltshire County Council, 1889–1904.

Selected publications
A guide to the collection of minerals (1862)
Mineralogical notes (1863)
Index to the collection of minerals: with references to the table cases in which the species to which they belong are exhibited at the British Museum (1866)
Mineralogical notices (1871)
Crystallography: Treatise on the Morphology of Crystals (1895) (Kessinger Publishing January 2008 )

See also
 Glossary of meteoritics

References

 Vanda Morton : Oxford rebels : the life and friends of Nevil Story Maskelyne 1823–1911 : pioneer Oxford scientist, photographer and politician, 1987

External links 

 

1823 births
1911 deaths
English geologists
Fellows of the Royal Society
Liberal Party (UK) MPs for English constituencies
Liberal Unionist Party MPs for English constituencies
Members of Wiltshire County Council
UK MPs 1880–1885
UK MPs 1885–1886
UK MPs 1886–1892
Wollaston Medal winners
Alumni of Wadham College, Oxford
Meteorite researchers
Artists' Rifles soldiers
Employees of the Natural History Museum, London
Members of the Parliament of the United Kingdom for Cricklade